Barbara A. Jones is an American physicist who works for IBM Research in San Jose, California, in the Quantum Applications group of IBM Quantum. Her research involves the quantum dynamics of magnetic systems.

Education and career
After graduating from Harvard College in 1982, Jones went to the University of Cambridge as a Churchill Scholar to study for Part III of the Mathematical Tripos, earning a master's degree there. She completed a Ph.D. at Cornell University in 1988, with research on the Kondo model of quantum impurities supervised by Chandra Varma.

She became a postdoctoral researcher at Harvard with Bertrand Halperin, working on High-temperature superconductivity, before joining IBM Research in 1989.

Recognition
Jones was elected as a Fellow of the American Physical Society (APS) in 2002, after a nomination from the APS Division of Condensed Matter Physics, "for outstanding contributions to theories of impurity magnetism and spin transport in magnetic nanostructures". She has chaired the APS Forum on Industrial Applications of Physics, the APS Division of Condensed Matter Physics, and the APS Committee on the Status of Women in Physics.

She is also a Fellow of the American Association for the Advancement of Science (AAAS), and has chaired the physics section of the AAAS.

References

Year of birth missing (living people)
Living people
American physicists
American women physicists
Harvard College alumni
Alumni of Churchill College, Cambridge
Cornell University alumni
IBM employees
Fellows of the American Physical Society
Fellows of the American Association for the Advancement of Science